Colona is a census-designated place (CDP) located in and governed by Ouray County, Colorado, United States. The CDP is a part of the Montrose, CO Micropolitan Statistical Area. The population of the Colona CDP was 30 at the United States Census 2010. The Montrose post office  serves the area.

History
The Colona post office was established in 1891, and remained in operation until 1943.  Colona is a name derived from Spanish meaning "colonist".

Geography

Demographics

See also

 List of census-designated places in Colorado

References

External links

 
 Colona School @ History Colorado
 Colona School & Grange @ Colorado Preservation
 Colona History
 Colona, Colorado Mining Claims And Mines
 Ouray County website

Census-designated places in Ouray County, Colorado
Census-designated places in Colorado
1887 establishments in Colorado